Zane William Smith (born December 28, 1960) is a former American professional baseball player.

Career
Smith, a left-handed pitcher, played collegiately at Indiana State University. He was drafted by the Atlanta Braves in the 3rd round of the 1982 amateur draft and made his Major League debut on September 10, 1984, for Atlanta. His first successful season was 1987 with the Braves, when he led the team with 15 wins, nearly twice as many as any other Braves pitcher on a team with only 69 wins. He was among the league leaders in wins (tied 5th), innings pitched (5th), games started (tied 1st), complete games (4th) and shutouts (tied 3rd).

Smith was traded from Atlanta to the Montreal Expos on July 2, 1989, for Sergio Valdez, Nate Minchey and minor leaguer Kevin Dean.  Just over a year later, on August 8, 1990, Smith was traded to the Pittsburgh Pirates for Scott Ruskin, Willie Greene and Moisés Alou. The trade allowed the Pirates to hold off the New York Mets down the stretch and win the National League Eastern Division pennant.  Smith contributed by winning 6 games, 3 of them complete games, 2 of those shutouts, while losing only 2, and compiling a 1.30 ERA.  It was during this season that Smith had his best performance, a 1 hit complete game shutout of the Mets in the first game of a doubleheader sweep that gave the Pirates a 2.5 game lead over the Mets.

Smith played with the Pirates through the 1994 season before signing as a free agent with the Boston Red Sox on April 18, 1995.  Smith did not have much success during the 1995 season for Boston, compiling a 5.61 ERA and an 8–8 record in 24 starts. The next offseason, he returned to the Pirates for a salary that was significantly reduced from the $3.125 million he earned in 1994. Smith pitched his final career game for the Pirates on July 5, 1996; he would be released by the Pirates the following day.

Highlights
On May 1, 1986, Smith struck out 12 Mets to end New York's club record tying 11 game win streak.

On April 17, 1988, Smith got Atlanta's first victory of the season, ending a 10-game season-opening losing streak that set an MLB record.

On October 3, 1995, Smith gave up a walk-off home run to Tony Peña to end Game 1 of the 1995 American League Division Series.

On June 7, 1996, Smith recorded the 100th and final win of his career, a complete game shutout at San Diego.

Personal
Smith has three daughters and lives near Atlanta.

Zane enjoys listening to hard-rock music.

References

External links

1960 births
Living people
American expatriate baseball players in Canada
Anderson Braves players
Atlanta Braves players
Baseball players from Wisconsin
Boston Red Sox players
Carolina Mudcats players
Durham Bulls players
Greenville Braves players
Indiana State Sycamores baseball players
Major League Baseball pitchers
Montreal Expos players
Pawtucket Red Sox players
Pittsburgh Pirates players
Richmond Braves players
Sportspeople from Madison, Wisconsin